The USA Gymnastics National Championships is the annual artistic gymnastics national competition held in the United States for elite-level competition. It is currently organized by USA Gymnastics, the governing body for gymnastics in the United States. The national championships have been held since 1963.

History
Before 1970, the Amateur Athletic Union (AAU) was the national governing body for gymnastics, so the USA Gymnastics national champions from 1963 to 1969 are not the official champions.

The first USA Gymnastics national championships were held in Park Ridge, Illinois, in June 1963. Since then, the event has been held each year, usually over a period of several days during the summer.

The record for most men's all-around titles is held by Sam Mikulak, who won six competitions from 2013 to 2016 and 2018 to 2019. The women's record of seven titles is held by Simone Biles, who won from 2013 to 2016, 2018 to 2019, and in 2021. Blaine Wilson won five consecutive times from 1996 to 2000. Joan Moore Gnat and John Roethlisberger have both won four times. Kurt Thomas, Kim Zmeskal, and Paul Hamm each won three times. The record for most individual titles across all events is Simone Biles, with twenty. The record for most titles in one event is held by Alicia Sacramone, who won six women's vault competitions from 2005 to 2008, 2010, and 2012.

In 2012, the top three finishers in the women's all-around were Jordyn Wieber, Gabby Douglas, and Aly Raisman. It was Wieber's second consecutive all-around title. In the individual events, Douglas won on uneven bars, Raisman won on balance beam and floor, and Sacramone won on vault. In the men's all-around, the top three finishers were John Orozco, Danell Leyva, and Sam Mikulak. It was Orozco's first all-around title. Leyva won on parallel bars and high bar, Jacob Dalton won on floor, Alexander Naddour won on pommel horse, Jonathan Horton won on rings, and Sean Senters won on vault.

In 2013, the top three finishers in the women's all-around were Simone Biles, Kyla Ross, and Brenna Dowell. In the individual events, Ross won on uneven bars and balance beam and her Olympic teammate McKayla Maroney won on vault and floor exercise; Biles swept the silver medals in each event. In the men's all-around, the top three finishers were Sam Mikulak, Alexander Naddour, and Jacob Dalton.

In 2014, the top three finishers in the women's all-around were Simone Biles, Kyla Ross, and Maggie Nichols. It was Biles's second consecutive all-around title. In the individual events, Biles won on both vault and floor exercise, Ross won on balance beam, and Ashton Locklear won on uneven bars. In the men's all-around, the top three finishers were Sam Mikulak, John Orozco, and Jacob Dalton. It was Mikulak's second consecutive all-around title. In the individual events, Dalton won on floor exercise, Mikulak won on pommel horse, Brandon Wynn won on still rings, Donnell Whittenburg won on vault, Danell Leyva won on parallel bars, and Orozco won on high bar.

In 2015, the top three finishers in the women's all-around were Simone Biles, Maggie Nichols, and Aly Raisman. It was Biles's third consecutive all-around title, and she became the first female gymnast since Kim Zmeskal (1990-1991-1992) to win the all-around 3 consecutive times. In the individual events, Biles won on both vault and balance beam, Madison Kocian won on uneven bars, and Raisman won on floor exercise. In the men's all-around, the top three finishers were Sam Mikulak, Donnell Whittenburg, and Chris Brooks. This was Mikulak's third consecutive all-around title, and he became the first male gymnast since Paul Hamm (2002-2003-2004) to win the all-around 3 consecutive times. In the individual events, Steven Legendre won on floor exercise, Alex Naddour won on pommel horse, Whittenburg won on still rings, Mikulak won on both vault and parallel bars, and Brooks won on high bar.

In 2016, the top three finishers in the women's all-around were Simone Biles, Aly Raisman, and Laurie Hernandez. It was Biles's fourth consecutive all-around title, and she became the first female gymnast since Joan Moore-Gnat (1971-1974) to win the all-around 4 consecutive times. In the individual events, Biles won on vault, balance beam, and floor exercise, and Ashton Locklear won on uneven bars. In the men's all-around, the top three finishers were Sam Mikulak, Chris Brooks, and Jake Dalton. This was Mikulak's fourth consecutive all-around title, and he became the first male gymnast since Blaine Wilson (1996-1999) to win the all-around four consecutive times. In the individual events, Dalton won on floor exercise and vault, Eddie Penev won on pommel horse, Donnell Whittenburg won on rings, Brooks won on parallel bars, and Paul Ruggeri won on high bar.

Championships

*Unofficial national champion

Senior Women's Medalists

Gallery

Event name
In recent years, the USA Gymnastics National Championships has been sponsored by various companies, and the event is typically named for the sponsoring company.

See also
American Cup
Nastia Liukin Cup
U.S. Classic
Winter Cup
U.S. Olympic Trials
List of medalists

References

External links
USA Gymnastics

 
Recurring sporting events established in 1963
1963 establishments in the United States